The Women's shot put event at the 1952 Summer Olympics took place on 20 July at the Helsinki Olympic Stadium. Russian athlete Nina Ponomaryova Ural Oblast from won the gold medal and set a new Olympic record.

Medalists

Results

Qualifying round

Qualification: Qualifying Performance 36.00 advance to the Final.

Final

References

External links
 Official Olympic Report, la84.org.

Athletics at the 1952 Summer Olympics
Discus throw at the Olympics
1952 in women's athletics
Women's events at the 1952 Summer Olympics